Yeni Kərki is a village and the least populous municipality in the Kangarli District of Nakhchivan, Azerbaijan.

It is located near to the Nakhchivan-Sharur highway, 14 km in the north-east from the district center. Its population is mainly busy with animal husbandry. There is a secondary school, club, library and a medical center in the village. It has a population of 380.

History
Yeni Kərki (New Karki) was founded by refugees from the village of Karki in the Sadarak District, which was occupied by Armenia on 19 January 1990, during the First Nagorno-Karabakh War.

References

Populated places in Kangarli District